The Fountain is a bi-monthly magazine of scientific and spiritual thought published by Blue Dome, Inc. As the English-language version of Sızıntı, it has been published since 1993 as a quarterly magazine till 2008. The Fountain is located in New Jersey. The magazine is controlled by the Hizmet Movement.

The Fountain covers a wide range of topics including interfaith dialog, science, technology, arts, culture and society from a faith perspective (especially Islam).

References

External links
 Official website

Bimonthly magazines published in the United States
Lifestyle magazines published in the United States
Quarterly magazines published in the United States
Magazines about spirituality
Magazines established in 1993
Magazines published in New Jersey
Gülen movement